WAIS may refer to:

 West Antarctic Ice Sheet
 Wechsler Adult Intelligence Scale
 Wide area information server (also, Wide area information service)
 WAIS (AM), a radio station (770 AM) licensed to Buchtel, Ohio, United States
 Westchester Academy for International Studies, a charter school in Houston, Texas, United States
 Western Australian Institute of Sport
 World Association of International Studies

See also 
 Wais (disambiguation)